Charles Henry Elston (August 1, 1891 – September 25, 1980) was a U.S. Representative from Ohio from 1939 to 1953.

Biography
Born in Marietta, Washington County, Ohio, Elston attended the public schools of Marietta and Cincinnati, Ohio.
Y.M.C.A. Law School (now known as NKU Chase College of Law), Cincinnati, LL.B., 1914.
He was admitted to the bar the same year and commenced practice in Cincinnati, Ohio.
He served as assistant prosecuting attorney of Hamilton County, Ohio from 1915 to 1922.
He served as member of the faculty of the Y.M.C.A. Law school from 1916 to 1936.
During the First World War, he served as an aviation cadet in the aviation service of the United States Army.
He also served as a member of the Hamilton County Charter Commission.

Elston was co-counsel in the George Remus murder trial, because he'd gained a reputation after getting another bootlegger, George "Fat" Wrassman, acquitted of murder.

Elston was elected as a Republican to the Seventy-sixth and to the six succeeding Congresses (January 3, 1939 – January 3, 1953).
He was not a candidate for renomination in 1952.
He resumed the practice of law in Cincinnati, Ohio.
He was a resident of Fort Lauderdale, Florida, where he died September 25, 1980.
He was interred in Lauderdale Memorial Gardens, Fort Lauderdale, Florida.

References

External links

1891 births
1980 deaths
Republican Party members of the United States House of Representatives from Ohio
Politicians from Cincinnati
Ohio lawyers
Politicians from Marietta, Ohio
Salmon P. Chase College of Law alumni
United States Army Air Service pilots of World War I
20th-century American politicians
20th-century American lawyers